Michael John Putnam (born June 1, 1983) is an American professional golfer who has played on the PGA Tour and the Web.com Tour.

Putnam was born in Tacoma, Washington. He played on the Nationwide Tour in 2006. He had two 2nd-place finishes on the Nationwide Tour in 2006 including losing in a playoff at the Rheem Classic. He finished 17th on the money list to earn his PGA Tour card for 2007. He finished 158th on the money list and dropped back to the Nationwide Tour in 2008. He played the Nationwide Tour through 2010 when he finished the year 24th on the money list and earned his 2011 PGA Tour card. Putnam finished 153rd on the PGA Tour money list and lost his Tour card after the 2011 season. In 2013, he finished the Web.com Tour (renamed from Nationwide Tour in 2012) regular season as the leading money winner and regained his PGA Tour card; Putnam was fully exempt as money leader. He was also voted Web.com Tour Player of the Year.

Putnam played the 2013 Web.com Tour season with his older brother, Joel, serving as his caddie. His younger brother, Andrew, plays on the PGA Tour and won the 2018 Barracuda Championship.

Amateur wins (1)
this list may be incomplete
2004 Pacific Coast Amateur

Professional wins (3)

Web.com Tour wins (3)

Web.com Tour playoff record (0–1)

Results in major championships

CUT = missed the half-way cut
"T" = tied for place

Results in The Players Championship

CUT = missed the halfway cut

U.S. national team appearances
Amateur
Palmer Cup: 2005 (winners)
Walker Cup: 2005 (winners)

See also
2006 Nationwide Tour graduates
2010 Nationwide Tour graduates
2010 PGA Tour Qualifying School graduates
2013 Web.com Tour Finals graduates

References

External links

American male golfers
Pepperdine Waves men's golfers
PGA Tour golfers
Korn Ferry Tour graduates
Golfers from Washington (state)
Sportspeople from Tacoma, Washington
People from Lakewood, Washington
1983 births
Living people